Giorgio Mondini (Born July 19, 1980) is an automobile racing driver from Geneva, Switzerland.

Career
Mondini began his competitive racing career at the age of 21, when he came 26th in the Formula Renault 2000 Eurocup series. In 2002 he made his way up to 17th place, before moving on to Formula Renault V6 Eurocup. In 2003 he achieved 7th place, and in 2004 became champion with three wins, three pole positions and a total of eight podiums. In 2005 he competed in the Formula Renault 3.5 Series with Eurointernational before moving to GP2 with DPR. He also tests for the Swiss A1GP team. When he made his GP2 debut in 2005 he raced with an Italian racing license.

In December 2005, Giorgio enjoyed his first taste of Formula One when he got behind the wheel of a Renault R25 as a reward for winning the Formula Renault V6 series. Then on February 3, 2006, Midland F1 Racing announced that Mondini would be competing as their third driver for nine of the 18 races.

On February 20, 2011 Mondini tested a F1 car for Hispania Racing in Barcelona.

Racing record

Career summary

* Includes points scored by other A1 Team Switzerland drivers

Complete Formula Renault 3.5 Series results
(key) (Races in bold indicate pole position) (Races in italics indicate fastest lap)

Complete GP2 Series results
(key) (Races in bold indicate pole position) (Races in italics indicate fastest lap)

Complete A1 Grand Prix results
(key) (Races in bold indicate pole position) (Races in italics indicate fastest lap)

Complete Formula One participations
(key)

24 Hours of Le Mans results

References

External links
 
 DriverDB
 
 

Living people
1980 births
Sportspeople from Geneva
Swiss racing drivers
North American Formula Renault drivers
German Formula Renault 2.0 drivers
Italian Formula Renault 2.0 drivers
Formula Renault V6 Eurocup drivers
GP2 Series drivers
A1 Team Switzerland drivers
24 Hours of Le Mans drivers
European Le Mans Series drivers
World Series Formula V8 3.5 drivers
Swiss people of Italian descent
Carlin racing drivers
Swiss Formula One drivers
EuroInternational drivers
Kolles Racing drivers
A1 Grand Prix drivers
Formula Renault Eurocup drivers
David Price Racing drivers
Jenzer Motorsport drivers
Aston Martin Racing drivers
Victory Engineering drivers
DAMS drivers